Tutak ( - Duthakh), is a town in Ağrı Province in the Eastern Anatolia region of Turkey. It is the seat of Tutak District. Its population is 7,059 (2021). It is located on a small plain surrounded by high mountains and watered by the Murat River, on the road from the city of Ağrı to the district of Patnos. Its altitude is 1,535 m. The mayor is Bülent Duru (AKP). 

Tutak is a small town providing schools, a hospital and other basic amenities to this impoverished rural district. The main source of income in the district is grazing livestock on the mountainside. 

Winters are long and hard with a lot of snow, summers are hot and dry.

Notable people 
 Halis Öztürk, politician

See also
Yazidis in Turkey

References

Populated places in Ağrı Province
Yazidis in Turkey
Kurdish settlements in Turkey